Suzhou Snail Digital Technology Co., Ltd., doing business as Snail, is a Chinese video game company and a Virtual Network Operator headquartered in Suzhou, China, which has branches Snail Games and Snail Mobile. Its division, Snail USA, is responsible for bringing Snail Games products to audiences in North America, South America & Europe. With a focus on free-to-play online games, Snail Games acts as a developer and publisher of original IP across multiple genres and distribution channels, including massively multiplayer online (MMOs), real-time strategy (RTS), and casual games. Its global registered user base has reached over 70 million accounts, largely driven by its independent games portal Woniu.com. The U.S. operation anticipated the launch of its portal for Western audiences in Q2 2011, PlaySnail.com, to further drive its efforts abroad.

History
Snail was founded by Shi Hai in Suzhou, China, and became established as Suzhou Electronic Co., Ltd. in October 2014. The company is one of the first online game developers in China. With over 1,500 employees, Snail has a global presence, with offices in China (Suzhou and Shanghai), Taiwan, Russia and the US, and has localized its games into more than 20 languages.

Snail Games has received numerous awards over the past decade, including the “China Cultural Games Overseas Development Award” 4 years in a row, the “China Top 10 Game Provider” 3 years in a row, and over 30 additional prestigious awards from government, industry, media, and player communities around the world.

Games
The Snail Games portfolio includes: Dark and Light, Fear the Night, Voyage Century Online, Heroes of Gaia (Castle of Heroes), Ministry of War (Terra Militaris), Age of Wushu, PixARK and more.

Notes

References 
Snail Games USA Announces Closed Beta Registration for The Chosen pc.ign.com, June 3, 2011
Snail Games launches Ministry of War massively.joystiq.com, November 17, 2010
Snail Games USA Announces Closed Beta Registration for The Chosen supervideogamer.com, June 6, 2011
Snail Games USA Launches New Payment Channel with Go Cash Game Card Partnership gamasutra.com, August 4, 2010
Snail Games Opens US HQ next-gen.biz, April 1, 2010
GameDuell, Snail Games USA, OMGPOP and The9 Choose Offerpal Media for Virtual Currency Monetization blog.tapjoy.com, June 10, 2010
Snail Games USA Announces Ministry of War Partnership with Kongregate mpogd.com, August 2, 2010
Snail Games Usa Announces Closed Beta Registration For The Chosen gameinatrix.com, June 3, 2011
About Snail snailgame.net, 2008
Snail Games USA Acquired Studio Wildcard, Developer of ARK, In December, 2015 mmos.com, December, 2015

External links 
 
 Snail USA
 Woniu.com
 Woniu.com 

Video game companies of the United States
Video game companies established in 2014
 Snail Games
Video game companies of China
Video game development companies
Video game publishers